Tiandra Tamika Ponteen (born 9 November 1984) is a Saint Kitts and Nevis sprinter who specializes in the 200 metres and the 400 metres.

She won the 400 metres silver medal at the 2005 Central American and Caribbean Championships. She reached the semi-final at the 1999 World Youth Championships, the 2002 World Junior Championships (in 200 m), the 2004 Olympic Games, the 2005 World Championships and the 2009 World Championships. She also competed at the 2000 World Junior Championships, the 2008 Olympic Games and the 2010 World Indoor Championships without progressing from the first round.

Her personal best times are 23.41 seconds in the 200 metres, achieved in April 2005 in Oxford; and 50.83 in the 400 metres, achieved in June 2005 in Sacramento. On the indoor track she has 23.24 seconds in the 200 metres, achieved in February 2006 in Fayetteville. She also holds the Saint Kitts record in the 4 x 100 metres relay, with 44.41 seconds achieved in July 2004 in Bogotá together with Carol Clarke, Nathandra John and Virgil Hodge.

References

1984 births
Living people
Saint Kitts and Nevis female sprinters
Athletes (track and field) at the 2004 Summer Olympics
Athletes (track and field) at the 2008 Summer Olympics
Olympic athletes of Saint Kitts and Nevis
Central American and Caribbean Games medalists in athletics
Olympic female sprinters